France competed at the 1992 Summer Paralympics in Barcelona, Spain. 145 competitors from France won 106 medals, 36 gold, 36 silver and 34 bronze and finished 4th in the medal table.

See also 
 France at the Paralympics
 France at the 1992 Summer Olympics

References 

France at the Paralympics
1992 in French sport
Nations at the 1992 Summer Paralympics